Stainton le Vale is a village in the civil parish of Thoresway  in the West Lindsey district of Lincolnshire, England. It is a former civil parish and lies in the Lincolnshire Wolds, a designated Area of Outstanding Natural Beauty.

In the 1086 Domesday Book it is named "Staintone",  with 39 households, land and a mill.

The parish church is a Grade II listed building dedicated to Saint Andrew and dating from 1300. It was restored in 1886, and again in 1914 after falling into ruin in the 17th century. The painting of the Agony in the Garden by Charles Edgar Buckeridge was originally in St Margaret's Church, Burton upon Trent.

Stainton le Vale CE School was recognised as a Church of England public elementary school in 1873; it appears to have closed in the summer of 1934.

References

External links

Villages in Lincolnshire
West Lindsey District
Former civil parishes in Lincolnshire